Glady Presbyterian Church and Manse is a historic Presbyterian church and parsonage at the junction of Randolph Ave. and 1st Street in Glady, Randolph County, West Virginia. The church was built in 1905, and is a Late Gothic Revival style building.  It sits on a stone pier foundation, has wood drop siding and a standing seam metal, front gable roof with exposed, curved rafter ends under the eaves. It features a pyramidal steeple.  The manse was built in 1908, and is a simple, two-story, American Foursquare building on a concrete block foundation and a hipped roof.  Also on the property is a privy built by the Works Progress Administration about 1935.

It was listed on the National Register of Historic Places in 2005.

References

American Foursquare architecture in West Virginia
Houses in Randolph County, West Virginia
Carpenter Gothic church buildings in West Virginia
Houses completed in 1908
Presbyterian churches in West Virginia
Churches on the National Register of Historic Places in West Virginia
Churches completed in 1905
Works Progress Administration in West Virginia
National Register of Historic Places in Randolph County, West Virginia
Houses on the National Register of Historic Places in West Virginia
1905 establishments in West Virginia